Rob Niter (born 1982) is an American actor and professional bodybuilder.

Background 

Niter serves as a senior master sergeant in the United States Air Force. He has received recognition in several military sources as a fitness trainer; and for winning bodybuilding and fitness championships. In 2013, he performed cardiopulmonary resuscitation on man for 25 minutes and brought him back to life. Niter told Houston Chronicle, “Sure it’s nice to be recognized, but it’s not about an award or a medal. The feeling of knowing that you saved someone’s life is truly an amazing feeling. Knowing that our actions that day prevented someone from dying and gave them another chance.”   He was later honored as a hero of Houston by then, mayor Annise Parker.

Career 

Niter's notable acting role was in David Gordon Green's, Halloween thriller.  He is expected to cast as a sheriff in the movie alongside actress and author, Jamie Lee Curtis.  According to The Post & Courier, Niter expressed his excitement about the film.  "I can't wait to meet Jamie Lee Curtis. It's exciting to be around all this talent," said Niter. According to Generation Iron and Muscle Insider news, Niter is expected to co-produce and make a cameo appearance in the film, Chase.

Filmography

Major awards 

 2013 – Houston Fire Department#16 Commendation Medal for life-saving actions
 2013 – City of Houston Commendation Medal by then, mayor Annise Parker
 2013 – United States Air Force Commendation Medal for acts of heroism in life-saving actions
 2013 – Honored as Hero of Houston

References

External links 
 

21st-century American male actors
American male film actors
American male television actors
African-American bodybuilders
African-American male actors
Fitness and figure competitors
Living people
1982 births
21st-century African-American sportspeople
20th-century African-American people